The Priory Church of St Bartholomew the Great, sometimes abbreviated to Great St Bart's, is a medieval church in the Church of England's Diocese of London located in Smithfield within the City of London. The building was founded as an Augustinian priory in 1123. It adjoins St Bartholomew's Hospital of the same foundation.

St Bartholomew the Great is so named to distinguish it from its neighbouring smaller church of St Bartholomew the Less, which was founded at the same time within the precincts of St Bartholomew's Hospital to serve as the hospital's parish church and occasional place of worship. The two parish churches were reunited in 2012 under one benefice.

History

Medieval church

The church was founded in 1123 by Rahere, a prebendary of St Paul's Cathedral and an Augustinian canon regular. While in Italy, he had a dream that a winged beast came and transported him to a high place, then relayed a message from "the High Trinity and...the court of Heaven" that he was to erect a church in the London suburb of Smithfield. Rahere travelled to London and was informed that the area in his vision – then a small cemetery – was royal property, and that nothing could be built upon it. Henry I, however, granted the title of the land to Rahere after he explained his divine message.

Rahere started construction on the building with the use of servants and child labourers, who collected stones from all over London.

The priory gained a reputation for curative powers, with many sick people filling its aisles, notably on 24 August (St Bartholomew's Day). Many miracles were attributed to occur within and without the walls of the building, including "a light sent from heaven" from its first foundation, and especially miraculous healings; many serious disabilities were claimed to be cured after a visit. Many of these cures were undertaken at the church hospital, the still existing St Bartholomew's Hospital.

The final Prior was Robert Fuller, the Abbot of Waltham Holy Cross. He was favoured by King Henry VIII, having been invited to attend the christening of Prince Edward, and did not oppose the dissolution of the Priory.

While much of the hospital survived the Dissolution of the Monasteries, about half of the priory's church was ransacked before being demolished in 1543. Having escaped the Great Fire of London of 1666, the church fell into disrepair, becoming occupied by squatters in the 18th century. W. G. Grace, however, was one famous congregant before its restoration in the late 19th century, when it was rebuilt under Sir Aston Webb's direction. During Canon Edwin Savage's tenure as rector, the church was further restored at the cost of more than £60,000. The surviving building had comprised part of a priory adjoining St Bartholomew's Hospital, but its nave was pulled down up to the last bay but the crossing and choir survive largely intact from the Norman and later Middle Ages, enabling its continued use as a parish church. The church and some of the priory buildings were briefly used as the third Dominican friary (Black Friars) of London, refounded by Queen Mary I of England in 1556 and closed in 1559. Part of the main entrance to the church remains at West Smithfield, nowadays most easily recognisable by its half-timbered, late 16th-century, Tudor frontage built on the older (13th-century) stone arch. This adaptation may originally have been carried out by the Dominican friars in the 1550s, or by the post-Reformation patron of the advowson, Lord Rich, Lord Chancellor of England (1547–51). From this gatehouse to the west door of the church, the path leads along roughly where the south aisle of the nave formerly existed. Very little trace of its monastic buildings now survive.

Later history
In the early 1720s, at the suggestion of Governor of Pennsylvania Sir William Keith, 4th Baronet, the American polymath and patriot Benjamin Franklin worked as a typesetter in a printer's shop in what is now the Church of St Bartholomew-the-Great.

The Lady chapel at the east end had been previously used for commercial purposes and it was there that Benjamin Franklin worked for a year as a journeyman printer. The north transept was also formerly used as a blacksmith's forge.

The principal remaining area of the churchyard is a raised garden, which was laid out by the Metropolitan Public Gardens Association's landscape gardener Fanny Wilkinson in 1885.

In 1889, a restoration programme began which saw the restoration of the Lady Chapel and south transept and a new north transept. The restored south transept was opened by Frederick Temple, the Bishop of London, on 14 March 1891; and the south transept in February 1893 in the presence of the Albert Edward, the Prince of Wales, Alexandra of Denmark (the Princess of Wales), Edward White Benson (the Archbishop of Canterbury) and other dignitaries.

The Priory Church was one of the few City churches to escape damage during the Blitz and, in 1941, was where the 11th Duke of Devonshire and the Hon Deborah Mitford were married.

The poet and heritage campaigner Sir John Betjeman kept a flat opposite the churchyard on Cloth Fair. Betjeman considered the church to have the finest surviving Norman interior in London.

In 2005 a memorial service was held for Sir William Wallace, on the 700th anniversary of the Scottish hero's execution nearby, organised by the historian David R. Ross.

Charitable distributions in the churchyard on Good Friday continue. A centuries-old tradition established when twenty-one sixpences were placed upon the gravestone of a woman stipulating that the bequest fund an annual distribution to twenty one widows in perpetuity, with freshly baked hot cross buns nowadays being given not only to widows but others.

The church was designated a Grade I listed building on 4 January 1950. In April 2007 it became the first Anglican parish church to charge an entrance fee to tourists not attending worship.

After a few years in which the rector of the church was simultaneously priest-in-charge of the nearby St Bartholomew the Less, which retained its own Parochial church council (PCC) and churchwardens, on 1 June 2015, the parishes of both churches were dissolved and replaced with the united benefice of Great St Bartholomew. The Rector of the former parish of St Bartholomew the Great became rector of the united benefice. The boundary of the new parish incorporates precisely both former parishes. There is now a single PCC and churchwardens responsible for both buildings. The parish church is St Bartholomew the Great, while St Bartholomew the Less is a chapel of ease within the parish.

Oriel window

The oriel window was installed inside St Bartholomew the Great in the early 16th century by Prior William Bolton,<ref>"William Bolton", Oxford Dictionary of National Biography..</ref> allegedly so that he could keep an eye on the monks. The symbol in the centre panel is a crossbow "bolt" passing through a "tun" (or barrel), a rebus or pun on the name of the prior.

William Camden wrote:

It may be doubtful whether Bolton, Prior of St Bartholomew, in Smithfield, was wiser when he invented for his name a bird-bolt through his Tun, or when he built him a house upon Harrow Hill, for fear of an inundation after a great conjunction of planets in the watery triplicity

Associated organisations
St Bartholomew the Great is the adopted church of various City livery companies hosting services throughout the year: the Worshipful Company of Butchers (one of the seven oldest livery companies), the Worshipful Company of Founders (whose Hall abuts the church), the Worshipful Company of Haberdashers (incorporated 1448 and No. 8 in City precedence), the Worshipful Company of Fletchers, the Worshipful Company of Farriers (incorporated 1674), the Worshipful Company of Farmers (incorporated 1955). The more recently established Worshipful Company of Information Technologists (incorporated 1992), the Worshipful Company of Hackney Carriage Drivers (incorporated 2004), the Worshipful Company of Tax Advisers (incorporated 2005) and the Company of Public Relations Practitioners (incorporated 2000) also have an association with St Bartholomew's.

The church served as the chapel of the Imperial Society of Knights Bachelor before the establishment of the society's permanent chapel in St Paul's Cathedral in 2005.

Film, television and music video
The church was the location of the "fourth wedding" (with Rowan Atkinson playing the nervous fictitious vicar Fr Gerald) in the film Four Weddings and a Funeral (1994) and of scenes in other films: Robin Hood: Prince of Thieves, Shakespeare in Love, the 1999 film version of Graham Greene's 1951 novel The End of the Affair, Amazing Grace (2006), Elizabeth: The Golden Age (2007), The Other Boleyn Girl (2008), Sherlock Holmes (2009), Richard II of The Hollow Crown (2012), Snow White and the Huntsman (2012), Testament of Youth (2014), Avengers: Age of Ultron (2015) and Transformers: The Last Knight (2017). It was also used in Taboo. It was used by T-Mobile as a stand-in for Westminster Abbey in its "royal wedding" advertisement (2011). It has also been the location for six music videos of Libera.

Rectors
E. A. Webb's history of St Bartholomew-the-Great provides an account of each rector up to W. F. G. Sandwith.

1544–1563† John Deane (founder of Sir John Deane's Grammar School)
1565–1569† Ralph Watson
1570–1579† Robert Binks
1580–1581 James Stancliffe
1582–1586 John Pratt
1587–1605 David Dee (deprived 1605; father of Bishop Francis Dee)
1605–1644† Thomas Westfield (as Bishop of Bristol from 1642)
1644– John Garrett
–1663 Ralph Harrison (incumbent since at least 1655, instituted 1660)
1663–1709† Anthony Burgess
1709–1717† John Pountney
1719–1738 Thomas Spateman (Prebendary of St Paul's)
1738–1760† Richard Thomas Bateman
1761–1768† John Moore
1768–1814† Owen Perrot Edwardes
1814–1819 John Richards Roberts
1819–1883† John Abbiss
1884–1887† William Panckridge
1887–1906† Sir Borradaile Savory 
1907–1929 William Fitzgerald Gambier Sandwith
1929–1944 Edwin Sidney Savage
1944–1979 Newell Eddius Wallbank (Prebendary of St Paul's)"Rev. Dr Newell Wallbank", Biographical Dictionary of the Organ.
1979–1991 Arthur Brown
1991–1993 David Lawson (imprisoned for drink-driving 1993)
1995–2016 Martin Dudley
Feb. 2018– Marcus Walker

† Rector died in postSeveral rectors served as President of Sion College: Thomas Westfield (1631, 1632), Thomas Spateman (1732), Owen Perrot Edwardes (1785), Sir Borradaile Savory (1905).

Music

Organ

St Bartholomew the Great had an organ installed by John Knopple in 1715. This was superseded by an organ in 1731 from Richard Bridge. In 1886, it was replaced by the organ from St Stephen Walbrook which was installed by William Hill. Further modifications were made in 1931 by Henry Speechly & Son, in 1957 by N.P. Mander and in 1982–83 by the firm of Peter Wells. Specifications of the church's organ are detailed on the National Pipe Organ Register. Currently, the church is using a Viscount digital organ for services, but the process of acquiring a new instrument (an American Symphonic Pipe Organ built by Schoenstein & Co.) has begun.

Choirs
Unusually for a parish church, the Priory Church Choir comprises professional singers; it is directed by Rupert Gough. A choir of amateur singers, the Rahere Singers, sings for some services.

Organists

Director of music
In 2009 the roles of Organist and Director of Music were divided into two posts.

Nigel Short 2009–15

Organist and director of music
In 2015 the roles of Organist and Director of Music were recombined as the new post of Organist and Director of Music''.

 Rupert Gough, 2015–present

Sub-organist
 Ben Horden, January 2016May 2017

Notable burials and monuments

Francis Anthony
George Hastings (died 1641)
John Hovyngham
Rice Mansel
Sir Walter Mildmay
Rahere

Notable people
 

William Peryn (died 1558), Catholic theologian and St Bartholomew Prior

Folklore
The ghost of Rahere is reputed to haunt the church, following an incident during repair work in the 19th century when the tomb was opened and a sandal removed. The sandal was returned to the church but not Rahere's foot, and Rahere since then, as a "shadowy, cowled figure appears from the gloom, brushes by astonished witnesses and fades slowly into thin air. Rahere is said to appear every year on the morning of July the 1st at 7 am, emerging from the Vestry".

See also

 Sir John Deane's College
 St Bartholomew the Less Church
 List of churches and cathedrals of London
 List of English abbeys, priories and friaries serving as parish churches

References

Further reading

External links

 Official website
 St Bartholomew's Priory, Smithfield, Records; The parish: descendants of Rich and the advowson
 Friends of City Churches website
 The Records of the priory and parish church: Two volumes of records, first published by E. A. Webb in 1921. Full-text, as part of British History Online.
Rahere's Garden: The History & Personalities of St Bartholomew the Great
 Photo essay and history of the priory
 Bell's Cathedrals: The Priory Church of St Bartholomew-the-Great, Smithfield from Project Gutenberg
 360 Panorama of Lady Chapel, St Bartholomew-the-Great, Smithfield
 360 Panorama inside St Bartholomew-the-Great, Smithfield

1123 establishments in England
12th-century church buildings in England
Anglo-Catholic church buildings in the City of London
Church of England church buildings in the City of London
Diocese of London
Grade I listed churches in the City of London
Religious organizations established in the 1120s
Reportedly haunted locations in London
Smithfield, London
Monasteries dissolved under the English Reformation